Neil Brown (born 11 March 1990) is a French ice dancer. He competes with Lucie Myslivečková for the Czech Republic. Until 2010, he competed for France with various partners.

Career 
Brown competed internationally for France during his junior career. In March 2007, he began skating with Maureen Ibanez. They placed 11th at the 2008 World Junior Championships.

During the 2008–2009 season, he competed with Rowan Musson. In April 2009, Brown teamed up with Geraldine Bott. They placed 10th at the 2010 World Junior Championships. The following season, they won a bronze medal at an ISU Junior Grand Prix event in Japan.

In 2011, Brown teamed up with Lucie Myslivečková to compete for the Czech Republic.

Programs

With Myslivečková

With Bott

With Ibanez

Competitive highlights

With Myslivečková for the Czech Republic

With Bott for France

With Musson for France

With Ibanez for France

References

External links 

 
 
 
 

French male ice dancers
1990 births
Living people
People from L'Arbresle
Sportspeople from Rhône (department)